Stephen Barrett (1718–1801) was a British classics teacher, who published some translations of Latin texts.

Life
Barrett was born in 1718 at Bent, in the parish of Kildwick in Craven, Yorkshire.  He was educated at the grammar school, Skipton, and at University College, Oxford and graduated with an MA in 1744.

Barrett entered the ministry, he became master of the free grammar school at Ashford, Kent, and was made rector of the parishes of Purton and Ickleford, Hertfordshire. In 1773, he resigned his mastership on receiving the living of Hothfield, Kent.

He continued to hold the living until his death, which occurred at Northiam, Sussex, on 26 November 1801.

Works
In 1746 Barrett published a Latin translation, which was admired at the time, of Pope's Pastorals.

Among his friends in early life were Dr. Johnson, and the founder of the Gentleman's Magazine, Edward Cave. To that magazine Barrett was a frequent contributor. Vol. xxiv. contains a letter, signed with his name, on a new method of modelling the tenses of Latin verbs.

In 1759, he published Ovid's Epistles translated into English verse, with critical essays and notes; being part of a poetical and oratorical lecture read to the grammar school of Ashford in the county of Kent, and calculated to initiate youth in the first principles of Taste.

He was also the author of War, an Epic Satire, and other trifles.

Family
He married Mary, daughter of Edward Jacob of Canterbury. They had a daughter who survived him.

Notes

References
Attribution
; Endnotes:
Gentlemen's Magazine lxxi. 1152
Nichols's Literary Anecdotes, ix. 672.

1718 births
1801 deaths
Schoolteachers from Kent
People from Hothfield